The subscription business model is a business model in which a customer must pay a recurring price at regular intervals for access to a product or service. The model was pioneered by publishers of books and periodicals in the 17th century, and is now used by many businesses, websites and even pharmaceutical companies in partnership with the government.

Subscriptions
Rather than selling producoffers periodic (daily, weekly, bi-weekly, monthly, semi-annual, yearly/annual, or seasonal) use or access to a product or service, or, in the case of performance-oriented organizations such as opera companies, tickets to the entire run of some set number of (e.g., five to fifteen) scheduled performances for an entire season. Thus, a one-time sale of a product can become a recurring sale and can build brand loyalty.

Industries that use this model include mail order book sales clubs and music sales clubs, private web mail providers, cable television, satellite television providers with pay television channels, providers with digital catalogs with downloadable music or eBooks, satellite radio, telephone companies, mobile network operators, internet providers, software publishers, websites (e.g., blogging websites), business solutions providers, financial services firms, health clubs, lawn mowing and snowplowing services, pharmaceuticals, renting an apartment, property taxes, as well as the traditional newspapers, magazines, and academic journals.

Renewal of a subscription may be periodic and activated automatically so that the cost of a new period is automatically paid for by a pre-authorized charge to a credit card or a checking account. A common variation of the model in online games and on websites is the freemium model, in which the first tier of content is free, but access to premium features (for example, game power-ups or article archives) is limited to paying subscribers.

Types and examples
There are different categories of subscriptions: to
A subscription for a fixed set of goods or services.
 Periodicals, such as a newspaper or magazine, have several types of subscriptions:
 Paid circulation
 Non-paid circulation
 Controlled circulation
 Subscription boxes contain a variety of consumables
 Community-supported agriculture
 Meal delivery service
 Meal kit delivery service
A subscription for unlimited use of a service or collection of services. Usage may be personal and non-transferable, for a family, or under certain circumstances, for a group utilizing a service at one time. In the publishing industry, a subscription to a bundle of several journals, at a discounted price, is known as a "big deal".
 Software as a service
A pay-as-you-go subscription where you subscribe to purchase a product periodically. This is also known as the convenience model because it is a convenience for the customer to not have to remember to go find their product and buy it periodically. This model has been popularized by companies like Dollar Shave Club, Birchbox, and OrderGroove. Based on their success, many other retailers have begun to offer subscription model services. 
 For example, a subscription to a rail pass by a company may not be individualized but might permit all employees of that firm to use the service. For goods with an unlimited supply and for many luxury services, subscriptions of this type are rare.
A subscription for basic access or minimal service plus some additional charge depending on usage. A basic telephone service pays a pre-determined fee for monthly use but may have extra charges for additional services such as long-distance calls, directory services and pay-per-call services. When the basic service is offered free of charge, this business model is often referred to as Freemium.
An online subscription for supporting content creators using crowdfunding. Fans can interact and send a tip to the content creator but also have access to exclusive paid content. Popular examples are Patreon and OnlyFans.

Publishing
In publishing, the subscription model typically involves a Paywall, Paysite or other "toll-access" system (named in opposition to open access). As revenues from digital advertising diminish, a paid subscription model is being favoured by more publishers who see it as a comparatively stable income stream.

Academic journals 

In the field of academic publishing, the subscription business model means that articles of a specific journal or conference proceedings are only available to subscribers. Subscriptions are typically sold to universities and other higher education institutions and research institutes, though some academic publishers also sell individual subscriptions or access to individual articles.

In contrast with other media such as newspapers, subscription fees to academic publishers generally do not go towards supporting the creation of the content: the scientific articles are written by scientists and reviewed by other scientists as part of their work duties. The paper authors and reviewers are not paid by the publisher. In this light, the subscription model has been called undesirable by proponents of the open access movement.

Academic publications which use the subscription model are called "closed-access", by opposition to their open-access counterparts.

Effects

Vendors
Businesses benefit because they are assured a predictable and constant revenue stream from subscribed individuals for the duration of the subscriber's agreement. Not only does this greatly reduce uncertainty and the riskiness of the enterprise, but it often provides payment in advance (as with magazines, concert tickets), while allowing customers to become greatly attached to using the service and, therefore, more likely to extend by signing an agreement for the next period close to when the current agreement expires.

An integrated software solutions, for example, the subscription pricing structure is designed so that the revenue stream from the recurring subscriptions is considerably greater than the revenue from simple one-time purchases. In some subscription schemes (like magazines), it also increases sales, by not giving subscribers the option to accept or reject any specific issue. This reduces customer acquisition costs, and allows personalized marketing or database marketing. However, a requirement of the system is that the business must have in place an accurate, reliable, and timely way to manage and track subscriptions.

From a marketing-analyst perspective, it has the added benefit that the vendor knows the number of currently active members since a subscription typically involves a contractual agreement. This so-called 'contractual' setting facilitates customer relationship management to a large extent because the analyst knows who is an active customer and who recently churned.

Additional benefits include a higher average customer lifetime value (ACLV) than that of nonrecurring business models, greater customer inertia and a more committed customer base as it transitions from purchase to opt-out decisions, and more potential for upselling and cross-selling other products or services.

Some software companies such as Adobe and Autodesk have moved from a perpetual licensing model to a subscription model, known as "software as a service". This move has significant implications for sales and customer support organizations. Over time, the need to close large deals decreases resulting in lower sales costs. However, the size of the customer support organization increases so that the paying customers stay happy.

Customers
Consumers may find subscriptions convenient if they believe that they will buy a product on a regular basis and that they might save money. For repeated delivery of the product or service, the customer also saves time.

Subscriptions which exist to support clubs and organizations call their subscribers "members" and they are given access to a group with similar interests. An example might be the Computer Science Book Club.

Subscription pricing can make it easier to pay for expensive items since it can often be paid for over a period of time and thus can make the product seem more affordable. On the other hand, most newspaper and magazine-type subscriptions are paid upfront, and this might actually prevent some customers from subscribing. Fixed price may be an advantage for consumers using those services frequently. However, it could be a disadvantage to a customer who plans to use the service frequently but later does not. The commitment to paying for a package may have been more expensive than a single purchase would have been. In addition, subscription models increase the possibility of vendor lock-in, which can have fatally business-critical implications for a customer if its business depends on the availability of a software: For example, without an online connection to a licensing server to verify the licensing status every once in a while, a software under a subscription-model would typically stop functioning or fall back to the functionality of a freemium version, thereby making it impossible (to continue) to use the software in remote places or in particularly secure environments without internet access, after the vendor has stopped supporting the version or software, or even has gone out of business thereby leaving the customer without a chance to renew the subscription and access his own data or designs maintained with the software (in some businesses it is important to have full access even to old files for decades). Also, consumers may find repeated payments to be onerous.

Subscription models often require or allow the business to gather substantial amounts of information from the customer (such as magazine mailing lists) and this raises issues of privacy.

A subscription model may be beneficial for the software buyer if it forces the supplier to improve its product. Accordingly, a psychological phenomenon may occur when a customer renews a subscription, that may not occur during a one-time transaction: if the buyer is not satisfied with the service, he/she can simply leave the subscription to expire and find another seller.

This is in contrast to many one-time transactions when customers are forced to make significant commitments through high software prices. Some feel that historically, the "one-time-purchase" model does not give sellers incentive to maintain relationships with their customers (after all, why should they care once they've received their money?). Some who favor a subscription model for software do so because it may change this situation.

The subscription model should align customer and vendor toward common goals, as both stands to benefit if the customer receives value from the subscription.  The customer that receives value is more likely to renew the subscription and possibly at an increased rate.  The customer that does not receive value will, in theory, return to the marketplace.

Environment
Because customers may not need or want all the items received, this can lead to waste and an adverse effect on the environment, depending on the products. Greater volumes of production, greater energy and natural resource consumption, and subsequently greater disposal costs are incurred.

Subscription models might also create the opposite effect. This can be illustrated by subscribing to a service for mowing lawns. The effective use of a single mower increases when mowing for a collection of homes, instead of every family owning their own lawnmower which is not used as much as the service providing mower, the use of resources for producing lawnmowers, therefore, decreases while lawns stay cut.

See also
 Payment system
 Index of accounting articles
 Outline of economics
 List of financial accounting topics
 Outline of marketing
 Rent-seeking
 Pay to play

References

Business models
Mass media industry
Bundled products or services
Types of subscription services
Subscription services
Revenue models